The Sergipe gubernatorial election was held on 5 October 2014 to elect the next governor of the state of Sergipe. If no candidate had received more than 50% of the vote, a second-round runoff election would have been held on 26 October.  Governor Jackson Barreto ran for his first full term after assuming the Governorship in December 2013 and won in the first round.

Candidates

Coalitions

Opinion Polling

Results

References

2014 Brazilian gubernatorial elections
October 2014 events in South America
Sergipe gubernatorial elections